Gérard Durand-Poudret (born 14 July 1959) is a French cross-country skier. He competed in the men's 15 kilometre event at the 1980 Winter Olympics.

References

1959 births
Living people
French male cross-country skiers
Olympic cross-country skiers of France
Cross-country skiers at the 1980 Winter Olympics
Place of birth missing (living people)
20th-century French people